The Leader of the Labour Party in the House of Lords is the parliamentary chairperson of the Labour Party of the House of Lords. The Labour Party peers elect the Leader of the Labour Party in the House of Lords.

When the Labour Party is the main party of opposition in the House of Commons, this post also acts as Shadow Leader of the House of Lords.

The current incumbent, Angela Smith, Baroness Smith of Basildon, was appointed in May 2015.

List of Labour Leaders in the House of Lords

See also
 Leader of the Labour Party (UK)

References

External links

 

pl:Liberalni Demokraci#Liderzy liberalnych demokratów